Ziółkowski (feminine Ziółkowska, plural Ziółkowscy) is a Polish surname. It may refer to:
 Aleksandra Ziolkowska-Boehm (born 1949), Polish author
 Andrew Ziolkowski (1963–1994), Australian politician
 Fabrice Ziolkowski (born 1954), French-American screenwriter, director, producer, and voice director
 Jan M. Ziolkowski (born 1956), American linguist and philosopher
 Janusz Ziółkowski (1924–2000), Polish sociologist
 Jim Ziolkowski, American businessman 
 Korczak Ziolkowski (1908–1982), Polish-American designer and sculptor
Marek Ziółkowski (born 1955), Polish diplomat
 Richard W. Ziolkowski, American scientist and engineer 
 Ruth Ziolkowski (1926–2014), American director of Crazy Horse Memorial
 Szymon Ziółkowski (born 1976), Polish hammer thrower
 Theodore Ziolkowski (1932–2020), American scholar in German studies and comparative literature

See also
 

Polish-language surnames